Thomas Austin Murphy (May 11, 1911—November 17, 1991) was an American bishop of the Roman Catholic Church. He served as an auxiliary bishop of the Archdiocese of Baltimore from 1962 to 1984.

Biography
Thomas Murphy was born in Baltimore, Maryland, the second of five children of Thomas Andrew and Ella Cecilia (née Brady) Murphy. He received his early education at St. Martin parochial school, and graduated from high school in 1925. He attended St. Charles College in Catonsville and St. Mary's Seminary in Baltimore.

On June 10, 1937, he was ordained to the priesthood by Archbishop Michael Joseph Curley. His first assignment was as a curate at his hometown parish of St. Martin Church and afterward at St. Dominic Church. In 1951, Murphy was transferred to St. Rose of Lima Church, of which he became pastor in 1961. He also served as director of the Legion of Decency, moderator of the Archdiocesan Veteran Mission Crusade, and a member of the Archdiocesan Tribunal, Clergymen's Interfaith Committee on Human Rights, and Social Action Committee.

On May 23, 1962, Murphy was appointed Auxiliary Bishop of Baltimore and Titular Bishop of Appiaria by Pope John XXIII. He received his episcopal consecration on the following July 3 from Archbishop Egidio Vagnozzi, with Bishops John Joyce Russell and Michael William Hyle serving as co-consecrators, at the Cathedral of Mary Our Queen. He remained as pastor of St. Rose until 1972, but continued his residence there. He continued to serve as an auxiliary bishop until his retirement on May 29, 1984.

Murphy died at age 80, and was buried in the crypt at the Cathedral of Mary Our Queen in Baltimore.

See also

References

1911 births
1981 deaths
Participants in the Second Vatican Council
Religious leaders from Baltimore
20th-century American Roman Catholic titular bishops
St. Charles College alumni
St. Mary's Seminary and University alumni